The 2017 Argentina Open was a men's tennis tournament played on outdoor clay courts. It was the 20th edition of the ATP Buenos Aires event, and part of the ATP World Tour 250 series of the 2017 ATP World Tour. It took place in Buenos Aires, Argentina, from February 13 through 19, 2017.

Points and prize money

Point distribution

Prize money

Singles main-draw entrants

Seeds 

1 Rankings are as of February 6, 2017.

Other entrants 
The following players received wildcards into the main draw:
  Carlos Berlocq
  Leonardo Mayer
  Janko Tipsarević

The following player received entry as a special exempt:
  Víctor Estrella Burgos

The following players received entry from the qualifying draw:
  Guido Andreozzi
  Rogério Dutra Silva 
  Alessandro Giannessi 
  Jozef Kovalík

Retirements 
  Leonardo Mayer

Doubles main-draw entrants

Seeds 

1 Rankings are as of February 6, 2017.

Other entrants 
The following pairs received wildcards into the main draw:
  Guido Andreozzi /  Nicolás Kicker
  Renzo Olivo /  Guido Pella

Withdrawals 
During the tournament
  Pablo Carreño Busta

Finals

Singles 

  Alexandr Dolgopolov defeated  Kei Nishikori, 7–6(7–4), 6–4

Doubles 

  Juan Sebastián Cabal /  Robert Farah defeated  Santiago González /  David Marrero, 6–1, 6–4

External links 

 

Argentina Open
ATP Buenos Aires
Argentina Open
Argentina Open